Xiaoshi may refer to:

Xiaoshi, Benxi County (小市镇), town and county seat of Benxi Manchu Autonomous County, Liaoning, China
Xiaoshi, Huaining County (小市镇), town in Huaining County, Anhui, China
Xiaoshi Middle School, in Ningbo, Zhejiang, China